The 1978 Orange Bowl was the 44th edition of the college football bowl game, played at the Orange Bowl in Miami, Florida, on Monday, January 2. Part of the 1977–78 bowl game season, it matched the sixth-ranked Arkansas Razorbacks of the Southwest Conference (SWC) against the heavily-favored #2 Oklahoma Sooners of the Big Eight Conference.

The Razorbacks were  but were heavy underdogs. Oklahoma now had the inside track to the national championship, if they beat Arkansas. In the regular season, Texas defeated Oklahoma and Arkansas on consecutive weekends en route to its 

New Year's Day was on Sunday in 1978, and the major college bowl games were played the following day.

Teams

Both teams had only one loss, to top-ranked Texas.

Arkansas

To complicate matters for Arkansas, first-year head coach Lou Holtz suspended three players prior to the game for team violations. Two of those players, running back Ben Cowins and wide receiver Donny Bobo, had accounted for 78% of the Hogs' points. Oklahoma was led by redshirt sophomore halfback Billy Sims, a future Heisman Trophy winner, and on defense by safety Darrol Ray and linebacker Daryl Hunt.

Although the suspended Arkansas players protested, Holtz refused to back down and the suspensions stood. Already considered a heavy underdog to Oklahoma, with the loss of those starters Arkansas was expected to give little competition in the game. Arkansas was an 18-point underdog prior to the suspensions. After the suspensions, they were given as 24-point underdogs by Las Vegas oddsmakers. The Orange Bowl would likely decide the national championship; it did, but not in the way that most expected. This was their first appearance in the Orange Bowl.

Oklahoma

The Sooners' only loss was by seven points to Texas in Dallas in early October; this was their ninth appearance in the Orange Bowl.

Game summary
Backup running back Roland Sales started for Arkansas in the place of Cowins. With Sales doing most of the running of the ball, Arkansas out-rushed Oklahoma 126 yards to 116 yards in the first half, with Sims fumbling the ball early in the first quarter causing the Razorbacks to recover on the Oklahoma 9 yard line. That resulted in a Sales touchdown (followed by a PAT kicker Steve Little). Another Oklahoma fumble by Kenny King resulted in another Arkansas touchdown rushed in by Hog quarterback Ron Calcagni in the first quarter. In the second half, Sales rushed for another touchdown, Brian White rushed for a touchdown and Little kicked a field goal. A ferocious Arkansas defense, led by defensive tackle Dan Hampton, built a  lead after three quarters. Oklahoma scored early in the fourth, but the two-point conversion attempt failed.

Sales rushed 22 times for 205 yards, an Orange Bowl record; he also caught four passes for 52 yards and rushed for two touchdowns. Arkansas defeated Oklahoma 31–6. Sales' Orange Bowl rushing record stood for twenty years, until broken by Ahman Green (206 yards in 1998). Sales and Arkansas teammate Reggie Freeman were named MVPs for the game. Arkansas was third in both final polls, behind Notre Dame (Holtz' future employer) and Alabama.

The halftime show was a presentation of the Main Street Electrical Parade, one of only two times the parade has taken place outside a Disney park.

Scoring
First quarter
Arkansas – Roland Sales 1-yard run (Steve Little kick)
Arkansas – Ron Calcagni 1-yard run (Little kick)
Second quarter
No scoring
Third quarter
Arkansas – Little 32-yard FG
Arkansas – Sales 4-yard run (Little kick)
Fourth quarter
Oklahoma – Victor Hicks 8-yard pass from Dean Blevins (run failed)
Arkansas – Barnabas White 20-yard run (Little kick)

Statistics
{| class=wikitable style="text-align:center"
! Statistics !! Arkansas !! Oklahoma
|-
| First Downs || 22||19
|-
| Rushes–yards|| 60–317|| 49–230
|-
| Passing yards|| 90|| 80
|-
| Passes (C–A–I) ||7–12–0 ||7–14–1 
|-
| Total Offense ||72–407||63–310
|-
|Punts–average ||4–40.5|| 5–44.4
|-
|Fumbles–lost ||2–1|| 4–3
|-
|Turnovers||1||4
|-
|Penalties–yards ||7–50|| 5–25
|}

Aftermath
Arkansas climbed to third in the final AP poll and Oklahoma fell to seventh.

The Sooners returned the following year and defeated conference rival Nebraska. The Razorbacks' only other Orange Bowl was a rematch eight years later, a 42–8 loss to Oklahoma.

References

Orange Bowl
Orange Bowl
Arkansas Razorbacks football bowl games
Oklahoma Sooners football bowl games
Orange Bowl
January 1978 sports events in the United States